Giancarlo Giannini (born 1 August 1942) is an Italian actor and voice actor.  He won the Cannes Film Festival Award for Best Actor for his performance in Love and Anarchy (1973) and received an Academy Award nomination for Seven Beauties (1975). He is also a four-time recipient of the David di Donatello Award for Best Actor.

Giannini began his career on stage, starring in Franco Zeffirelli's productions of Romeo and Juliet and A Midsummer Night's Dream. After appearing predominantly on television throughout the early 1960s, he had his first lead role in a film in Rita the Mosquito (1965), the first of many collaborations with filmmaker Lina Wertmüller. He rose to international stardom through Wertmüller's The Seduction of Mimi (1972), Love and Anarchy (1973), Swept Away (1974), culminating in his Oscar-nominated turn in Seven Beauties (1975).

His other films include The Innocent (1976), Lili Marleen (1980), New York Stories (1990), A Walk in the Clouds (1995), Man on Fire (2004), and the James Bond films Casino Royale (2006) and Quantum of Solace (2008). He is also a dubbing artist, contributing voice work to the Italian-language versions of dozens of films since the 1960s. He has been the official Italian dubber of Al Pacino since 1975, and has also dubbed Jack Nicholson, Michael Douglas, and Helmut Berger.

Early life 
Giannini was born in La Spezia and he spent most of his childhood in the settlement of Pitelli. In 1952, Giannini and his family moved to Naples where he received a diploma in electronic engineering at the Alessandro Volta Technological State Technical Institute. During his teen years, he moved to Rome and studied at the Accademia Nazionale di Arte Drammatica Silvio D'Amico.

Acting career

Stage 
Giannini made his stage debut at the age of 18, opposite Lilla Brignone in In memoria di una signora amica, directed by Giuseppe Patroni Griffi. His breakthrough came when he was cast by Franco Zeffirelli in a production of Romeo and Juliet which played at The Old Vic.

Film and television 

Giannini made his film debut in a small part in I criminali della metropoli in 1965. He appeared in supporting roles in Anzio and The Secret of Santa Vittoria, and starred in the original version of Swept Away. In 1967, he was a special guest on an episode of Mina's TV show "Sabato Sera". In 1971, he appeared in E le stelle stanno a guardare, a television adaptation of A. J. Cronin's novel The Stars Look Down.

Giannini won a Cannes Film Festival Award for Best Actor for his performance in Love and Anarchy (1973). In 1976, he starred in Seven Beauties, for which he was nominated for the Academy Award for Best Actor. Giannini is known for his starring roles in films directed by Lina Wertmüller. In addition to Seven Beauties and Swept Away, he also appeared in The Seduction of Mimi, Love and Anarchy, A Night Full of Rain, and Francesca e Nunziata.

Giannini has also achieved some international success. His fluency in English has brought him a number of featured roles in Hollywood productions, most notably as Inspector Pazzi in Hannibal. He also appeared in Man on Fire. Giannini played Alberto Aragón in A Walk in the Clouds in 1995, and Emperor Shaddam IV in the 2000 Dune miniseries. In 2002, he starred in the horror film Darkness. He later portrayed French agent René Mathis in the James Bond films Casino Royale (2006) and Quantum of Solace (2008).

In 2009, Giannini received a star on the Italian Walk of Fame in Toronto, Canada. He is currently set to receive a star on the Hollywood Walk of Fame in 2021.

Voice acting 
Giannini has had a successful career as a voice actor and dubber. He helped with the foundation of the C.V.D. along with Renato Turi, Corrado Gaipa, Valeria Valeri, Oreste Lionello, Wanda Tettoni and other dubbers.

Giannini is the official Italian voice dubber of Al Pacino. Both he and Ferruccio Amendola were the primary dubbers of Pacino until Amendola's death in 2001 when Giannini became the main voice dubber. He also dubbed Jack Nicholson's voice as Jack Torrance in the Italian release of The Shining and the Joker in Batman and Michael Douglas as Gordon Gekko in Wall Street and the 2010 sequel as well as dubbing other actors such as Dustin Hoffman, Gérard Depardieu, Ryan O'Neal, Jeremy Irons, Mel Gibson, Tim Allen, Leonard Whiting and Ian McKellen in some of their work.

In Giannini's animated roles, he voiced Carl Fredricksen (voiced by Ed Asner) in the Italian dub of the Pixar film Up. He also provided the Italian voice of Raul Menendez in the Call of Duty game franchise. Outside of dubbing, he provided a voice role in the 2001 Italian animated film Momo in which he voiced the main antagonist.

Other ventures 
Aside from acting, Giannini took up inventing as a hobby. Some of the gadgets he designed were used in the 1992 film Toys starring Robin Williams. Giannini also collaborated with Gabriella Greison on his memoir Sono ancora un bambino which was published by Longanesi in 2014. A year later, he received the Premio Cesare Pavese.

In 2012 he collaborated with italian singer Eros Ramazzotti in "Io sono te", from his album Noi.

Personal life 
From 1967 until 1975, Giannini was married to actress Livia Giampalmo and they had two children. Their eldest son was Lorenzo, who died in 1987 from an aneurysm shortly before his 20th birthday. Their second-born son is actor Adriano Giannini, who played his father's role in the 2002 remake of Swept Away.

Since 1983, he has been married to Eurilla del Bono and they have two sons, Emanuele and Francesco who are musicians.

Selected filmography

Films 

 Libido (1965) as Christian
 Rita the Mosquito (1966) as Paolo Randi
 I criminali della metropoli (1967) as Gerard Lemaire
 Don't Sting the Mosquito (1967) as Paolo Randi
 Stasera mi butto (1967) as Carlo Timidoni
 Arabella (1967) as Saverio
 Anzio (1968) as Pvt. Cellini
 Fräulein Doktor (1969) as Lt. Hans Rupert
 Le sorelle (1969) as Dario
 The Secret of Santa Vittoria (1969) as Fabio
 Giacomo Casanova: Childhood and Adolescence (1969) as Giacomo Casanova (voice, uncredited)
 The Pizza Triangle (1970) as Nello
 Una macchia rosa (1970) as Giancarlo
 Una prostituta al servizio del pubblico e in regola con le leggi dello stato (1971) as Walter
 Mazzabubù... Quante corna stanno quaggiù? (1971) as Lucio, the newly wed
 Un aller simple (1971) as Weber
 Mio padre monsignore (1971) as Oreste
 Black Belly of the Tarantula (1971) as Inspector Tellini
 Hector the Mighty (1972) as Ulisse
 The Seduction of Mimi (a.k.a. Mimi metallurgico ferito nell'onore) (1972) as Carmelo Mardocheo detto Mimí
 Don Camillo e i giovani d'oggi (1972) as Veleno
 La prima notte di quiete (1972) as Giorgio Mosca aka 'Spider'
 Love and Anarchy (1973) as Antonio Soffiantini 'Tunin'
 It Was I (1973) as Biagio Solise
 The Sensual Man (1973) as Paolo Castorini
 How Funny Can Sex Be? (1973) as Domenico ("Signora sono le 8") / Cesaretto ("Due cuori e una baracca") / Enrico ("Non è mai troppo tardi") / Lello ("Viaggio di nozze") / Giansiro ("Torna piccina mia") / The Donor ("Lavoratore italiano all'estero") / Michele Maccò ("La vendetta") / Saturnino ("Un amore difficile") / Dottor Bianchi ("L'ospite")
 Drama of the Rich (1974) as Tullio Murri
 The Beast (1974) as Nino Patrovita
 Swept Away (1974) as Gennarino Carunchio
 The Immortal Bachelor (1975) as Gino Benacio
 Seven Beauties (1975) (a.k.a. Pasqualino Settebellezze) as Pasqualino Frafuso aka Settebellezze (Nomination Academy Award for best actor)
 The Innocent (1976) as Tullio Hermil
 A Night Full of Rain (1978) as Paolo
 Blood Feud (1978) as Nicola Sanmichele detto 'Nick'
 Lovers and Liars (1979) as Guido Massacesi
 Good News (1979) as L'Innominato
 Life Is Beautiful (1979) as Antonio Murillo
 Lili Marleen (1981) as Robert
 My Darling, My Dearest (1982) as Gennarino Laganà
 Where's Picone? (1984) as Salvatore Cannavacciuolo
 American Dreamer (1984) as Victor Marchand
 Fever Pitch (1985) as Charley
 Saving Grace (1986) as Abalardi
 Ternosecco (1987) as Domenico
 The Rogues (1987) as Guzman
 Snack Bar Budapest (1988) as Avvocato
 'o Re (1989) as Francis II of the Two Sicilies
 New York Stories (1989) as Claudio (segment "Life without Zoe")
 Blood Red (1989) as Sebastian Collogero
 The Sleazy Uncle (1989) as Riccardo
 Brown Bread Sandwiches (1989) as Alberto
 Time to Kill (1989) as Major
 Dark Illness (1990) as Giuseppe Marchi
 Nel giardino delle rose (1990) as Tramontano
 The Amusements of Private Life (1990) as Charles Renard
 Once Upon a Crime (1992) as Inspector Bonnard
 Giovanni Falcone (1993) as Paolo Borsellino
 Like Two Crocodiles (1994) as Pietro Fraschini
 A Walk in the Clouds (1995) as Alberto Aragón
 Palermo – Milan One Way (1995) as Turi Leofonte
 Celluloide (1996) as Sergio Amidei
 The Elective Affinities (1996) as narrator (voice)
 The Border (1996) as Von Zirkenitz
 La lupa (1996) as Padre Angiolino
 The Disappearance of Garcia Lorca (1996) as Taxi
 Ultimo bersaglio (1996) as Leo Steiner
 Más allá del jardín (1996) as Bernardo
 Cervellini fritti impanati (1996)
 Mimic (1997) as Manny
 Una vacanza all'inferno (1997) as Avv. Ortega
 Heaven Before I Die (1997) as Thief
 The Dinner (1998) as Professore
 Dolce far niente (1998) as Count Nencini
 The Room of the Scirocco (1998) as Marquis of Acquafurata
 Vuoti a perdere (1999) as Francesco Cesena
 Milonga (1999) as Commissioner
 Terra bruciata (1999) as Macrì
 Una noche con Sabrina Love (2000) as Leonardo
 Viper (2000) as Guastamacchia
 Welcome Albania (2000)
 Hannibal (2001) as Inspector Pazzi
 Una lunga lunga lunga notte d'amore (2001) as Marcello
 CQ (2001) as Enzo
 The Whole Shebang (2001) as Pop Bazinni
 Momo (2001) as Capo degli Uomini Grigi (voice)
 I Love You Eugenio (2002) as Eugenio
 Ciao America (2002) as Zi' Felice
 The Bankers of God: The Calvi Affair (2002) as Flavio Carboni
 Joshua (2002) as The Pope
 Darkness (2002) as Albert Rua
 The Council of Egypt (2002) as narrator (voice)
 Mario Monicelli, l'artigiano di Viareggio (2002) as himself
 Incantato (2003) as Cesare
 My House in Umbria (2003, TV Movie) as Inspector Girotti
 Five Moons Square (2003) as Branco
 L'acqua... il fuoco (2003) as David
 Forever (2003) as Giovanni
 Man on Fire (2004) as Miguel Manzano
 13 at a Table (2004) as Older Giulio
 Raul: Straight to Kill (2005) as Giudice Porfirio
 The Shadow Dancer (2005) as Father Moretti
 Tirant lo Blanc (2006) as Emperor of Visantia
 Salvatore – Questa è la vita (2006) as Timpaliscia
 Casino Royale (2006) as René Mathis
 Milano Palermo – Il ritorno (2007) as Turi Leofonte
 Bastardi (2008) as Il Gatto
 Quantum of Solace (2008) as René Mathis
 La bella società (2010) as Dott. Guarrasi
 La prima notte della luna (2010) as Ivan
  (2012) as Lorenzo
 AmeriQua (2013) as Don Cesare Ferracane
 Ti ho cercata in tutti i necrologi (2013) as Nikita
 Promakhos (2014, directed by Coerte Voorhees, John Voorhees) as Petros
 Shades of Truth, (2015, directed by Liana Marabini) as Aaron Azulai
 On Air: Storia di un successo (2016) as Presidente
 Il ragazzo della Giudecca (2016) as Giudice Mangrella
 Prigioniero Della Mia Liberta (2016)
 Oggi a te... domani a me (2016)
 Nobili bugie (2017) as Franco
 The Neighborhood (2017) as Gianluca Moretti
 Tulipani, Love, Honour and a Bicycle (2017) as Catarella
 Pipi, Pupu & Rosemary: the Mystery of the Stolen Notes (2017) as narrator (voice)
 Liubov pret-a-porte (2017) as Giorgio's father
 The Catcher Was a Spy (2018) as Professor Eduardo Amaldi
 Magical Nights (2018) as Leandro Saponaro

Television 
 "Sabato Sera" (1967, one episode)
 E le stelle stanno a guardare (1971) as Arthur Barras
 Sins (1986)
 Vita coi figli (1990) as Adriano Setti
 Frank Herbert's Dune (2000) as Emperor Shaddam IV
 Catch-22 (2019) as Marcello
 Leonardo (2021) as Verrocchio

Dubbing roles

Live action 

Sonny Wortzik in Dog Day Afternoon
Steve Burns in Cruising
Ivan Travalian in Author! Author!
Richard Roma in Glengarry Glen Ross
Frank Slade in Scent of a Woman
Carlito Brigante in Carlito's Way
Vincent Hanna in Heat
Mayor John Pappas in City Hall
Richard III in Looking for Richard
Benjamin "Lefty" Ruggiero in Donnie Brasco
John Milton / Satan in The Devil's Advocate
Lowell Bergman in The Insider
Tony D'Amato in Any Given Sunday
Will Dormer in Insomnia
Viktor Taransky in Simone
Starkman in Gigli
Walter Burke in The Recruit
Shylock in The Merchant of Venice
Willy Bank in Ocean's Thirteen
Val in Stand Up Guys
Marvin Schwarzs in Once Upon a Time in Hollywood
Jimmy Hoffa in The Irishman
Aldo Gucci in House of Gucci
Jack Kevorkian in You Don't Know Jack
Phil Spector in Phil Spector
Joe Paterno in Paterno
Meyer Offerman in Hunters
Jack Torrance in The Shining
Jack Napier / Joker in Batman
David Locke in The Passenger
Jimmy Hoffa in Hoffa
Jerry Black in The Pledge
Harry Sanborn in Something's Gotta Give
Frank Costello in The Departed
Thomas Levy in Marathon Man
Pope John XXIII in John XXIII: The Pope of Peace
Gordon Gekko in Wall Street
Gordon Gekko in Wall Street: Money Never Sleeps
Andrew Shepard in The American President
Buddy Ackerman in Swimming with Sharks
Richard III in Richard III
Romeo in Romeo and Juliet
Larry Kelly in Callas Forever
Scott Calvin in The Santa Clause
John Valentine in Twilight Zone: The Movie
Mark in Zabriskie Point
Georges Danton in Danton
Obelix in Asterix & Obelix Take On Caesar
Edmond Dantès in The Count of Monte Cristo
Joseph Fouché in Napoléon
Andrei Chikatilo in Evilenko
Prince Hamlet in Hamlet
Tony in Looking for Mr. Goodbar
Crowe Wheelwright in Lawman
Charles Serking in Tales of Ordinary Madness

Animation 
Carl Fredricksen in Up
Fritz the Cat in Fritz the Cat

Video games 
Raul Menendez in Call of Duty: Black Ops II
Raul Menendez in Call of Duty: Black Ops 4

Awards and nominations

Academy Awards

David di Donatello

Nastro d'Argento

Film festivals

Other awards

Honours 
  Grand Officer (2nd Class), Order of Merit of the Italian Republic (2003)
  Knight Grand Cross (1st Class), Order of Merit of the Italian Republic (2007)

References

External links 

1942 births
Living people
People from La Spezia
Italian male television actors
Italian male film actors
Italian male voice actors
Italian male stage actors
Italian male video game actors
Italian film directors
20th-century Italian inventors
Accademia Nazionale di Arte Drammatica Silvio D'Amico alumni
Commanders of the Order of Merit of the Italian Republic
Cannes Film Festival Award for Best Actor winners
David di Donatello winners
Nastro d'Argento winners
Ciak d'oro winners
20th-century Italian male actors
21st-century Italian male actors